is a city located in Fukuoka Prefecture, Japan. The city was founded on April 1, 1954. 

As of January 31, 2012, the city has an estimated population of 37,579, with 13,102 households and a population density of 1,117.42 persons per km2. The total area is 33.63 km2.

Geography
Ōkawa is located in southern Fukuoka Prefecture next to the border with Saga Prefecture. The Chikugo River flows from northeast to southwest through the city, which is relatively flat. At the centre of Ōkawa, the Hanamune River flows into the Chikugo River as a tributary.

Neighboring municipalities
 Fukuoka Prefecture
 Kurume
 Ōki
 Yanagawa
 Saga Prefecture
 Saga
 Kanzaki

Sister cities
  Pordenone, Italy

References

External links

 Ōkawa City official website 

 
Cities in Fukuoka Prefecture